PEF, PeF, or Pef may stand for the following abbreviations:

 Palestine Exploration Fund
 Peak expiratory flow
 PEF Private University of Management Vienna
 Pentax raw file (see Raw image format)
 Perpetual Education Fund
 Perpetual Emigration Fund
 Pinellas Education Foundation, a nonprofit organization based in Florida
 Polyethylene 2,5-furandicarboxylate, a bioplastic material
 Preferred Executable Format
 Primary energy factor
 Princeton Evangelical Fellowship, a Christian campus ministry at Princeton University 
 Public Employees Federation, the New York state public employees union that is a member of AFL-CIO
 Punjab Education Foundation, a governmental education body in the Punjab, Pakistan

PEF may also refer to:
 the nickname of actor Pierre-François Martin-Laval